Alfredo Leyva (born 13 October 1969) is a Cuban wrestler. He competed in the men's freestyle 52 kg at the 1992 Summer Olympics.

References

1969 births
Living people
Cuban male sport wrestlers
Olympic wrestlers of Cuba
Wrestlers at the 1992 Summer Olympics
Place of birth missing (living people)
20th-century Cuban people